The National Front of the German Democratic Republic was an alliance of political parties (Blockpartei) and mass organizations in the German Democratic Republic, controlled by the Socialist Unity Party of Germany (SED), which stood in elections to the East German parliament, the Volkskammer ("People's Chamber").

The purpose of the NF was to give the impression that the GDR was a democracy governed by a broad-based coalition. In fact, all parties and mass organizations were subservient to the SED, and had to officially accept the SED's leading role as a condition of their existence. In elections, voters only had the option of approving or rejecting a single "united list" of NF candidates. Two of the block parties were formerly independent and two others were established on the instigation of the SED. The SED members on the list were always the majority because many candidates of the mass organizations were also SED members.

In the last weeks prior to the fall of the Berlin Wall (November 1989), some politicians of non-SED parties started to moderately criticize SED dominance. The Front disbanded in February 1990, a month before the first free elections in the GDR.

Constituent parties

Constituent mass organizations represented in the People's Chamber

Other organizations associated with the National Front
The following organizations, which were part of the NF, did not send elected representatives to the Volkskammer but were active in the performance of its activities.

History
 
The National Front was the successor to the Demokratischer Block which had been founded in the Soviet occupation zone. The Front itself was founded on 30 March 1950. It operated through the issuing of a generally consistent proportion of seats (divided between the Front's parties and SED-controlled mass organisations) submitted in the form of a single list of candidates during each election to the People's Chamber.  Seats were awarded on the basis of a set quota rather than vote totals. As voters only had the option of approving or rejecting the list in far-from-secret conditions, it "won" with virtually unanimous levels of support.

Although nominally a broad-based coalition of parties, in practice the SED was the only one with any real power.  By ensuring that Communists dominated the lists, the SED essentially predetermined the composition of the People's Chamber.

In 1950-1951, the public rejection of the validity of the list by some German politicians resulted in some of them being imprisoned for "rejecting the electoral law of the German Democratic Republic" (as in the case of LDPD leader Günter Stempel).  Although the SED had already become a full-fledged Stalinist "party of the new type" by the formation of the GDR, the other parties did not completely bend to the SED's will for a time.  By the mid-1950s, however, the more courageous members of the constituent parties had been pushed out, and the parties had all been transformed into loyal partners of the SED.  By this time, the SED itself had purged its few independent-minded members as well.  The Front now took on a character similar to other groupings in the Eastern Bloc.  For the next three decades, the minor parties in the Front had to accept the SED's "leading role" as a condition of their continued existence.

On 1 December 1989, the Front was effectively rendered impotent when the Volkskammer deleted the provision of the Constitution of East Germany  that gave the SED a monopoly of power.   Four days later, the Christian Democratic Union and Liberal Democratic Party, having thrown out their pro-Communist leaderships, withdrew from the Front. On 16 December the SED, having transformed itself into a democratic socialist party, reformed itself into the Party of Democratic Socialism. On 20 February 1990, an amendment to the constitution removed mention of the Front.

Chairmen of the National Front 
 Prof. Erich Correns (1950–1981)                                                       
 Prof.  (1981–1989)

Electoral history

Volkskammer elections

See also 

 Politics of East Germany
 List of Volkskammer members (9th election period)
 Vietnamese Fatherland Front
 Democratic Front for the Reunification of the Fatherland in North Korea
 Polish Committee of National Liberation/Front of National Unity
 National Front
 Fatherland Front
 People's Democratic Front/Front of Socialist Unity and Democracy
 Lao Front for National Construction
 National United Front of Kampuchea

References

External links
Die Transformation der DDR-Blockparteien während und nach der politischen Wende

Popular fronts of communist states
Defunct political party alliances in Germany
Political parties in East Germany
Socialist Unity Party of Germany